Elizabeth Bishop (22 May 1785 – 8 January 1817) was Robert Burns's first child following an affair with Elizabeth Paton (1760 – c. 1799).

Expressing warm tenderness to his Love-begotten Daughter and welcoming his child, Robert Burns wrote the following lines:

She lived as a child at Mossgiel Farm, under Burns's mother's care, until Robert Burns's death. She then returned to her own mother, who was by this time married to John Andrew, a ploughman. At the age of twenty-one, Elizabeth received two hundred pounds from the money raised for the support of Burns's family.

She married John Bishop, factor to the Baillie of Polkemmet, also recorded as an innkeeper, and had seven children. Elizabeth died aged only 32, possibly during childbirth.

When Burns contemplated emigration to Jamaica he made over his heritable property and the profits from the 'Kilmarnock Edition' of his poems to his brother, Gilbert Burns, to enable him to bring up Elizabeth as if she was one of his own.

References 

1785 births
1817 deaths
18th-century Scottish women
19th-century Scottish women
Robert Burns
Burns family